The 254 Series is a meter gauge freight diesel locomotive built for Ferrocarrils de la Generalitat de Catalunya (FGC).

Three locomotives were built in 1990 by Meinfesa, at the same time as the RENFE Class 319.2 with which it shares a similar external appearance, as well as both having GM-EMD engines and transmissions.

The locomotive is used for potash and salt trains, and occasional special historical passenger trains, on the Llobregat–Anoia Line.

References

External links

FGC serie 254, Images via www.flickr.com
FGC - 254, Images and stock list, www.listadotren.es
Caract. técnicas - Material motor - FGC 254, Technical details,  www.listadotren.es

Diesel locomotives of Spain
Metre gauge diesel locomotives
254 Series
Railway locomotives introduced in 1990
Llobregat–Anoia Line